The men's free skating competition of the roller skating events at the 2011 Pan American Games was held between October 23 and 24 at the Pan American Skating Track in Guadalajara. The defending Pan American Games champion is Marcel Sturmer of Brazil.

Schedule
All times are Central Standard Time (UTC-6).

Results
7 athletes from 7 countries competed.

References

Roller skating at the 2011 Pan American Games